HMSML Gleaner (H86) was the smallest commissioned vessel in the Royal Navy, at the time of her decommissioning, with a length of just under 15 metres and a ship's company of just nine (two officers, one Senior Rating and six Junior Ratings). She was based in Devonport, Plymouth. The ship prefix "HMSML" stands for Her Majesty's Survey Motor Launch.

Gleaner was withdrawn from service in February 2018. A replacement vessel,  was commissioned in June 2018.

History
Gleaner was the sixth ship to bear the name and was commissioned on 5 December 1983.

As an advanced survey vessel, Gleaner possessed an array of sophisticated technology, including multibeam and sidescan sonar to collect bathymetry and seabed texture data and compile an accurate and detailed picture of the seabed for later analysis. Her survey equipment also included an Applanix POS MV system for georeferencing and motion compensation, C-NAV GPS, Kongsberg EM2040 Multibeam Echo Sounder and Kongsberg EA400 Singlebeam Echo Sounder.

Gleaner also has the distinction of being one of a handful of Royal Navy ships to have visited landlocked Switzerland, having travelled up the Rhine to Basel in 1988. Earlier visits were by HMS Flintham and Dittisham in 1969, and HMS Sabre and Cutlass in 1979.

She was also in attendance at the 2010 Portsmouth Navy Days.

This work was necessary as the most recent survey was 60 years old.

Gleaner entered Plymouth for the last time on 31 January 2018 before being decommissioned.

References

External links

Survey vessels of the Royal Navy
1983 ships